Mayra Tatiana Ramírez Ramírez (born 23 March 1999) is a Colombian professional footballer who plays as a midfielder for Spanish Primera División club Levante UD and the Colombia women's national team.

International career
Ramírez made her senior debut for Colombia on 19 July 2018 in a 0–1 friendly loss to Costa Rica.

References

1999 births
Living people
Women's association football midfielders
Colombian women's footballers
People from Cundinamarca Department
Colombia women's international footballers
Pan American Games gold medalists for Colombia
Pan American Games medalists in football
Footballers at the 2019 Pan American Games
Medalists at the 2019 Pan American Games
Sporting de Huelva players
Primera División (women) players
Colombian expatriate women's footballers
Expatriate women's footballers in Spain